Benjamin Harrison Taylor  (April 2, 1889 – November 3, 1946) was a professional baseball player who played pitcher in the Major Leagues for the 1912 Cincinnati Reds. Prior to that, he pitched for the Cincinnati Pippins of the United States Baseball League, until that team disbanded in June 1912. After his Major League stint, he moved to Bedford, Indiana and became an interior designer. He died in an automobile accident, of which he was the sole fatality (his wife and his parents-in-law all survived), in 1946.

References

External links

1889 births
1946 deaths
Major League Baseball pitchers
Baseball players from Indiana
Cincinnati Reds players
Saginaw Wa-was players
Indianapolis Hoosiers (minor league) players
People from Paoli, Indiana
Cincinnati Cams players
Road incident deaths in Indiana